Denis Kudla was the defending champion but chose not to defend his title.

Ričardas Berankis won the title after defeating Yannick Maden 6–3, 7–5 in the final.

Seeds
All seeds receive a bye into the second round.

Draw

Finals

Top half

Section 1

Section 2

Bottom half

Section 3

Section 4

References
Main draw
Qualifying draw

Challenger Banque Nationale de Drummondville - Singles
2019 Singles